In mathematics, the Bishop–Gromov inequality is a comparison theorem in Riemannian geometry, named after Richard L. Bishop and Mikhail Gromov. It is closely related to Myers' theorem, and is the key point in the proof of Gromov's compactness theorem.

Statement
Let  be a complete n-dimensional Riemannian manifold whose Ricci curvature satisfies the lower bound

 

for a constant . Let  be the complete n-dimensional simply connected space  of constant sectional curvature  (and hence of constant Ricci curvature ); thus   is the n-sphere of  radius  if , or n-dimensional Euclidean space if , or  an appropriately rescaled version of n-dimensional hyperbolic space if . Denote by  the ball of radius r around a point p, defined with respect to the Riemannian distance function.

 

As r goes to zero, the ratio approaches one, so together with the monotonicity this implies that
 
This is the version first proved by  Bishop.

See also
 Comparison theorem
 Gromov's inequality (disambiguation)

References

Riemannian geometry
Geometric inequalities